Occidentalism is a distorted and stereotyped image of Western society (the occident), which can be held by people inside and outside the Western world and which can be articulated or implicit. The term emerged as the reciprocal of the notion of Orientalism – Western stereotypes of the Eastern world, the Orient.

Occidental representations
In China "Traditions Regarding Western Countries" became a regular part of the Twenty-Four Histories from the 5th century CE, when commentary about The West concentrated upon on an area that did not extend farther than Syria. The extension of European imperialism in the 18th and 19th centuries established, represented, and defined the existence of an "Eastern world" and of a "Western world". Western stereotypes appear in works of Indian, Chinese and Japanese art of those times. At the same time, Western influence in politics, culture, economics and science came to be constructed through an imaginative geography of West and East.

Occidentalism debated
In Occidentalism: The West in the Eyes of its Enemies (2004), Buruma and Margalit argue that nationalist and nativist resistance to the West replicates Eastern-world responses against the socio-economic forces of modernization, which originated in Western culture, among utopian radicals and conservative nationalists who viewed capitalism, liberalism, and secularism as forces destructive of their societies and cultures. While the early responses to the West were a genuine encounter between alien cultures, many of the later manifestations of Occidentalism betray the influence of Western ideas upon Eastern intellectuals, such as the supremacy of the nation-state, the Romantic rejection of rationality, and the spiritual impoverishment of the citizenry of liberal democracies.

Buruma and Margalit trace that resistance to German Romanticism and to the debates, between the Westernisers and the Slavophiles in 19th-century Russia, and show that like arguments appear in the ideologies of Zionism, Maoism, Islamism, and Imperial Japanese nationalism. Nonetheless, Alastair Bonnett rejects the analyses of Buruma and Margalit as Eurocentric, and said that the field of Occidentalism emerged from the interconnection of Eastern and Western intellectual traditions.

See also 
 Anti-Western sentiment
 Colonialism
 Decolonization
 Euroscepticism
 Global arrogance
 Indigenism
 Islamism
 Latin America
 Maoism
 Orient
 Orientalism
 Pan-Arabism
 Zionism

References

Further reading
 
 Buruma, I. and Margalit, A., Occidentalism: A Short History of Anti-Westernism, Atlantic Books, London, 2004. .
 Carrier, James G. Occidentalism: Images of the West, Oxford, Clarendon Press, 1995. , .
 Chen, Xiaomei, Occidentalism: A Theory Of Counter-Discourse in Post-Mao China, second ed., rev. and expanded. Lanham, Maryland: Rowman & Littlefield, 2002. .
 Cohen, Nick, What's Left?: How the Left Lost its Way, New York, Harper Perennial, 2007. . 
 Hanafi, Hassan, Muqaddimah fi 'ilm al-istighrab (Introduction to Occidentalism), Cairo, Madbuli, 1991.
 König, Daniel G., Arabic-Islamic Views of the Latin West. Tracing the Emergence of Medieval Europe, Oxford, OUP, 2015.
 Souza, Teotonio R. de, "Orientalism, Occidentosis and Other Viral Strains: Historical Objectivity and Social Responsibilities", in The Portuguese, Indian Ocean and European Bridgeheads, Festschrift in Honour of Prof. K.S. Mathew, eds Pius Malekandathil & Jamal Mohammed, Fundação Oriente, India, 2001. . pp. 452–479. https://web.archive.org/web/20160422180612/https://pt.scribd.com/doc/30027278/Orientalism-Occidentosis-and-Other-Viral-Strains-Historical-Objectivity-and-Social-Responsibilities

History of international relations
Western culture